The Sovereign class is Royal Caribbean Cruises Ltd's third generation of cruise ship, formerly operated by Royal Caribbean International

The three ships of the class were built in Saint-Nazaire, France at the Chantiers de l'Atlantique shipyards. The first modern "megaships" to be built, they also were the first series of cruise ships to include a multi-story atrium with glass elevators, which the ship's designer, Njål Eide, referred to as the "Centrum". They also had a single deck devoted entirely to cabins with private balconies instead of oceanview cabins. Sovereign held this distinction until 1990 when Norway succeeded her after being refurbished with the addition of two more decks. In 1991, Royal Caribbean International launched a slightly modified sister ship, Monarch of the Seas. In 1992, the line launched its third and final sister ship, Majesty of the Seas. These ships were among the largest modern cruise ships to sail during the late 1980s and early 1990s.

During that time, other major cruise lines also followed suit, building ships that included many of the same features and similar dimensions as the Sovereign class. Princess Cruises also countered by launching two ships in 1990 and 1991 to compete with the Sovereign class,  Crown Princess and Regal Princess. They also featured an atrium and two decks devoted to cabins with private balconies instead of windowed "oceanview" cabins. Since then, newer and larger ships have exceeded the size of the Sovereign-class ships. They are less than half the size of the  ships and about a third the size of  ships.

Royal Caribbean Cruises Ltd transferred Sovereign of the Seas and Monarch of the Seas from Royal Caribbean International to their Pullmantur Cruises subsidiary in 2008 and 2013, respectively. Plans to transfer Majesty of the Seas to Pullmantur in 2016 had been announced in November 2014. However in July 2015, Royal Caribbean reversed those plans, instead stating that Majesty of the Seas would stay with Royal Caribbean International and be receiving a massive overhaul and upgrade in early 2016 to bring her up to today's standards.

As of July 2020, the first two ships, Sovereign and Monarch, have been sold for scrap, due to the bankruptcy of Pullmantur Cruises. In December 2020, Royal Caribbean sold the remaining ship Majesty of the Seas to Seajets who renamed her Majesty. Seajets renamed the ship Majesty of the Oceans in April 2021, while still laid up at Piraeus.

Ships

References

Cruise ship classes
Royal Caribbean International